Tony Goodin (born 23 November 1988) is a New Zealand first-class cricketer who plays for Northern Districts.

References

External links
 

1988 births
Living people
New Zealand cricketers
Northern Districts cricketers
Cricketers from Hamilton, New Zealand